Ruth Ellis (née Neilson; 9 October 1926 – 13 July 1955) was a British nightclub hostess and convicted murderer who became the last woman to be hanged in the United Kingdom following the fatal shooting of her lover, David Blakely.

In her teens, Ellis had entered the world of nightclub hostessing, which led to a chaotic life that included various relationships with men. One of these men was David Blakely, a racing driver engaged to another woman. On Easter Sunday, 10 April 1955, Ellis shot Blakely dead outside The Magdala public house in Hampstead, London, and she was immediately arrested by an off-duty policeman. At her trial in June 1955, she was found guilty of murder and was sentenced to death; on 13 July she was hanged at HMP Holloway.

Early life
Ruth Ellis was born Ruth Neilson in Rhyl, Denbighshire, Wales, on 9 October 1926, the fifth of six children. She moved to Basingstoke, Hampshire, England, with her family during her childhood. Her mother, Elisaberta (Bertha) Goethals, was a Belgian war refugee; her father, Arthur Hornby, was a cellist from Manchester. The Register of Marriages gives Arthur Hornby as marrying Elisa B. Goethals at Chorlton-cum-Hardy in 1920. Arthur had changed his surname to Neilson after the birth of Ruth's older sister Muriel in 1925.

In 1928, when Ruth was aged two, Arthur's twin brother Charles was killed when his bicycle collided with a steam wagon. According to Muriel, Arthur became physically and sexually abusive shortly after his brother's death, with Bertha being aware of the abuse but taking no action. The sexual abuse eventually resulted in Muriel conceiving a child by her father at age 14, which led to Arthur being questioned, and ultimately released, by police; the child, a son, was brought up as a sibling to the other children. Arthur turned his attention towards Ruth after Muriel reached puberty, but Ruth continually resisted the abuse.

Ruth briefly attended Fairfields Senior Girls' School in Basingstoke, leaving when she was aged 14. She found work as an usherette at a cinema in Reading, Berkshire. Shortly afterwards, in 1940, Arthur moved to London after being offered the live-in position of caretaker-chauffeur for Porn & Dunwoody Ltd, a lift manufacturer. The following year, while her older brother Julian was on leave from service in the Royal Navy, Ruth befriended his girlfriend, Edna Turvey, who introduced her to what Muriel later called "the fast life." Ruth and Edna eventually moved to London and lodged with Ruth's father. He continued his abuse of Ruth while engaging in an affair with Edna, which ended when Bertha made an unannounced visit and caught the pair in bed. Bertha herself moved to London soon afterward.

In 1944, 17-year-old Ruth became pregnant by a married Canadian soldier named Clare Andrea McCallum. She was subsequently forced to move to a nursing hospital in Gilsland, Cumberland, where she gave birth to a son named Clare Andria Neilson, also known as "Andy", on September 15. The father sent money for about a year, then stopped. Andy eventually went to live with Bertha, while Ellis supported the child by working in several factory and clerical jobs.

Career
By the end of the 1940s, Ruth had become a nightclub hostess in Hampstead through nude-modelling work, which paid significantly more than her previous jobs. Morris Conley, her manager at the Court Club in Duke Street, blackmailed his hostess employees into sleeping with him. By early 1950, Ruth was making money as a full-service escort, and became pregnant by one of her regular clients. She had this pregnancy terminated (illegally) in the third month and returned to work as soon as she could.

On 8 November 1950, Ruth married 41-year-old George Johnston Ellis, a divorced dentist with two sons, at the register office in Tonbridge, Kent. A regular customer at the Court Club, George was a violent and possessive alcoholic who became convinced that his new wife was having an affair. Ruth left him several times but always returned. When she gave birth to a daughter, Georgina, in 1951, George refused to acknowledge paternity; they separated shortly afterwards and later divorced. 

In 1951, while she had been four months pregnant, Ruth appeared, uncredited, as a beauty queen in the Rank film Lady Godiva Rides Again. She returned to prostitution following her divorce from Ellis, having moved into her parents' residence with her daughter.

Murder
In 1953, Ruth became the manager of the Little Club, a nightclub in Knightsbridge. At this time, she was lavished with expensive gifts by admirers and had a number of celebrity friends. Ellis met David Blakely, three years her junior, through racing driver Mike Hawthorn. Blakely was a former public school boy who was educated at Shrewsbury School and Sandhurst, but was also a hard-drinking racer. Within weeks, he moved into Ruth's flat above the club despite being engaged to another woman, Mary Dawson. Ruth became pregnant for a fourth time but had her second termination, feeling she could not reciprocate the level of commitment Blakely showed towards their relationship.

Ruth then began seeing Desmond Cussen, a former Royal Air Force pilot who had flown Lancaster bombers during the Second World War, and who had taken up accountancy after leaving the service. He was appointed a director of the family business Cussen & Co., a wholesale and retail tobacconist with outlets in London and South Wales. Ruth eventually moved in with Cussen at 20 Goodward Court, Devonshire Street, north of Oxford Street. The relationship with Blakely continued, however, and became increasingly violent as he and Ruth continued to see other people. Blakely offered to marry Ruth; she consented, but in January 1955 she had another miscarriage after he punched her in the stomach during an argument.

On Easter Sunday, 10 April 1955, Ruth took a taxi from Cussen's home to a second-floor flat at 29 Tanza Road, Hampstead, the home of Anthony and Carole Findlater, where she suspected Blakely might be.

At around 9:30 pm, Blakely and his friend Clive Gunnell emerged. Blakely passed Ruth waiting on the pavement when she stepped out of the doorway of Henshaw's, a newsagent next to The Magdala. As Blakely searched for the keys to his car, Ruth took a .38 calibre Smith & Wesson Victory Model revolver from her handbag and fired five shots at Blakely. The first shot missed. Ruth pursued Blakely as he started to run around the car, firing a second shot which caused him to collapse onto the pavement. She then stood over him and fired three more bullets, with one fired less than half an inch from his back, leaving powder burns on his skin.

Ruth was seen to stand over Blakely as she repeatedly tried to fire the revolver's sixth shot, finally firing it into the ground. This bullet ricocheted off the road and injured Gladys Yule, a bystander, who lost the use of her right thumb.

Trial
Ruth, in apparent shock, asked Gunnell, "Will you call the police, Clive?" She was arrested immediately by an off-duty policeman, who heard her say, "I am guilty, I'm a little confused." Blakely's body was taken to hospital with multiple fatal wounds to the intestines, liver, lung, aorta and trachea. Originally taken in as evidence, the revolver is now in the Metropolitan Police's Crime Museum.

At Hampstead police station, Ruth appeared to be calm and not obviously under the influence of drink or drugs. She made her first appearance at a magistrates' court on 11 April 1955, and was ordered to be held on remand. Ruth was twice examined by principal Medical Officer, M. R. Penry Williams, who failed to find evidence of mental illness; an electroencephalograph examination on 3 May found no abnormality. While on remand, Ruth was examined by psychiatrist Duncan Whittaker for the defence and by Alexander Dalzell on behalf of the Home Office. Neither found evidence of insanity.

On 20 June 1955, Ruth appeared in the Number One Court at the Old Bailey, London, before Mr Justice Havers. She was dressed in a black suit and white silk blouse with freshly bleached and coiffured blonde hair. Her defending counsel, Aubrey Melford Stevenson, supported by Sebag Shaw and Peter Rawlinson, expressed concern about her appearance (and dyed blonde hair) but she did not alter it to appear less striking.

The only question put to Ruth by prosecutor Christmas Humphreys was, "When you fired the revolver at close range into the body of David Blakely, what did you intend to do?"; her answer was, "It's obvious when I shot him I intended to kill him." This reply guaranteed a guilty verdict and the mandatory death sentence. The jury took twenty minutes to convict her.

Reprieve decision
Ruth remained at Holloway Prison while awaiting execution. She told her mother that she did not want a petition to reprieve her from the death sentence and took no part in the campaign. However, at her relatives' urging her solicitor, John Bickford, wrote a seven-page letter to Home Secretary Gwilym Lloyd George setting out the grounds for reprieve. Lloyd George denied the request. Ruth dismissed Bickford (who had been chosen by Cussen) and asked to see Leon Simmons, the clerk to solicitor Victor Mishcon (whose law firm had previously represented her in her divorce proceedings). Before going to see her, Simmons and Mishcon visited Bickford, who urged them to ask her where she had obtained the gun. 

On 12 July 1955, the day before her execution, Mishcon and Simmons saw Ruth, who wanted to make her will. When they pressed Ellis for the full story, she asked them to promise not to use what she said to try to secure a reprieve; Mishcon refused. Ruth divulged that Cussen had given her the gun and taught her how to use it on the weekend prior to the murder. She also revealed that Cussen had also driven her to the murder scene. Following a two-hour interview, Mishcon and Simmons went to the Home Office; the Permanent Secretary, Sir Frank Newsam, was summoned back to London and ordered the head of Criminal Investigation Department (CID) to check the story. Lloyd George later said that the police were able to make considerable enquiries but that it made no difference to his decision, and in fact, made Ruth's guilt greater showing the murder was premeditated. He also said that the injury to the bystander was decisive in his decision: "We cannot have people shooting off firearms in the street!"

In a final letter to Blakely's parents from her prison cell, Ruth wrote, "I have always loved your son, and I shall die still loving him."

Execution

The Bishop of Stepney, Joost de Blank, visited Ruth prior to her execution. Just before 9 am on 13 July, the hangman Albert Pierrepoint and his assistant entered her cell, and took her to the adjacent execution room where she was hanged. As was customary in British executions, Ruth was buried in an unmarked grave within the walls of Holloway Prison. Her headstone was inscribed "Ruth Hornby 1926–1955". Andy destroyed the headstone shortly before he committed suicide in 1982.

Public reaction and legacy
Ruth's case caused widespread controversy at the time, evoking exceptionally intense press and public interest to the point that it was discussed by the Cabinet. Then-Prime Minister Anthony Eden made no reference to the case in his memoirs, nor is there any mention in his papers. He accepted that the decision was the responsibility of the Home Secretary, but there are indications that he was troubled by it. A petition to the Home Office asking for clemency was signed by 50,000 people, but was rejected.

On the day of Ruth's execution, columnist Cassandra of the Daily Mirror attacked her sentence, writing: "The one thing that brings stature and dignity to mankind and raises us above the beasts will have been denied her — pity and the hope of ultimate redemption". The British Pathé newsreel reporting the execution openly questioned whether capital punishment—of a woman or of anyone—had a place in the 20th century. The novelist Raymond Chandler, then living in Britain, wrote a scathing letter to the Evening Standard referring to what he described as "the medieval savagery of the law".

Though the execution was on the whole supported by the British public, it helped strengthen support for the abolition of the death penalty, which was halted in practice for murder in Britain ten years later (the last execution in the UK occurred in 1964). Reprieve was by then commonplace, according to one statistical account, between 1926 and 1954, 677 men and 60 women had been sentenced to death in England and Wales, but only 375 men and seven women had been executed.

In the early 1970s, Bickford told Scotland Yard that Cussen had told him, in 1955, that Ellis lied at the trial. A police investigation followed but no further action regarding Cussen was taken.

Family aftermath
Ruth's former husband, George Ellis, committed suicide by hanging at a Jersey hotel on 2 August 1958. In 1969, Ellis's mother, Bertha Neilson, was found unconscious in a gas-filled room in her flat in Hemel Hempstead; she never fully recovered and did not speak coherently again.

Ruth's son Andy, who was aged 10 at the time of his mother's execution, took his life in a bedsit in 1982 shortly after desecrating her grave. The trial judge, Sir Cecil Havers, had sent money every year for Andy's upkeep, and Christmas Humphreys, the prosecution counsel at Ruth's trial, paid for his funeral. Her daughter Georgina, who was aged 3 when her mother was executed, was fostered when her father killed himself three years later. She died of cancer in 2001 at age 50.

Pardon campaign
The Ellis case continues to have a strong grip on the British imagination and in 2003 was referred back to the Court of Appeal by the Criminal Cases Review Commission (CCRC). The Court firmly rejected the appeal, although it made clear that it could rule only on the conviction based on the law as it stood in 1955, and not on whether she should have been executed. The court was critical of the fact that it had been obliged to consider the appeal:

In July 2007 a petition was published on the 10 Downing Street website asking Prime Minister Gordon Brown to reconsider the Ellis case and grant her a pardon in the light of new evidence that the jury at her trial was not asked to consider. It expired on 4 July 2008.

Film, TV and theatrical adaptations
In 1980, the third episode of the first series of the ITV drama series Lady Killers recreated the court case, with Ellis played by Georgina Hale.

The first cinema portrayal of Ellis came with the release of the 1985 film Dance with a Stranger, directed by Mike Newell and featuring Miranda Richardson as Ellis.

Both Ellis's story and the story of Albert Pierrepoint are retold in the stage play Follow Me, written by Ross Gurney-Randall and Dave Mounfield and directed by Guy Masterson. It premiered at the Assembly Rooms, Edinburgh as part of the 2007 Edinburgh Festival Fringe.

In the film Pierrepoint (2006), Ellis was portrayed by Mary Stockley.

Diana Dors, who had starred in Lady Godiva Rides Again, in which Ellis had a minor, uncredited role, played a character resembling (though not based on) Ellis in the 1956 British film Yield to the Night, directed by J. Lee Thompson.

The case was the basis for Amanda Whittington's play The Thrill of Love. It premiered at the New Vic Theatre, Newcastle-under-Lyme, in February 2013 and subsequently played at St James Theatre London with Faye Castelow in the main role. Maxine Peake played Ellis in an adaptation of Whittington's play, broadcast on 5 November 2016 by BBC Radio 4.

The life of Ellis was the inspiration behind a musical play by Lucy Rivers, Sinners Club. A co-production with Theatr Clwyd, it premiered at The Other Room Theatre in Cardiff, in February 2017.

The Ruth Ellis story was dramatized in the Murder Maps series of documentaries on the Yesterday Channel on 2 November 2017. It featured Monica Weller, ghostwriter of Ruth Ellis: My Sister's Secret Life.

The story was also the inspiration for the 2015 opera Entanglement by the composer Charlotte Bray.

The case was re-examined by film-maker Gillian Pachter in the 2018 BBC Four documentary series The Ruth Ellis Files: A Very British Crime Story. Part I examined a tape recording made by Andria and found in his flat after his death and suggested that Ellis may have been the victim of domestic abuse by Blakely, that the gun used may have been supplied by Cussen and that the taxi taken by Ellis to the Magdala pub may have been driven by Cussen.

In the season 1 finale of Deadly Women, Ruth Ellis is portrayed by Carissa Singleton while murder victim David Blakely is played by Jimmy Aschner.

Notes

References
Blackhall, Sue (2009). "Ruth Ellis", True Crime: Crimes of Passion. Igloo. 
Bresler, Fenton (1965) Reprieve. George G. Harrap & Co. Ltd., London.

Further reading

Hancock, Robert (1963). Ruth Ellis: The Last Woman to Be Hanged. Orion; 3rd edition 2000. 
Mark, Laurence and Van Den Bergh, Tony (1990). Ruth Ellis: a Case of Diminished Responsibility?. Penguin.

External links
The Execution of Ruth Ellis (The Spectator on 15 July 1955)

Ruth Ellis's story at Crime Library

Court of Appeal decision
Scotsman report

1926 births
1955 deaths
20th-century British criminals
20th-century executions by England and Wales
Executed Welsh women
Murder in London
People convicted of murder by England and Wales
People executed for murder
People from Rhyl
British female murderers
Welsh female prostitutes
Welsh people convicted of murder
Executed Welsh people
Welsh people of Belgian descent
Welsh people of English descent
20th-century Welsh women
1955 murders in the United Kingdom
1950s murders in London